Vanguard Reaches is a 1981 role-playing game supplement for Traveller published by Paranoia Press.

Contents
Vanguard Reaches is a book that encompasses 16 new subsectors and several client and independent star states.

Publication history
Vanguard Reaches was written by Chuck Kallenbach II and was published in 1981 by Paranoia Press as a 28-page book with a map.

Reception
William A. Barton reviewed Vanguard Reaches in The Space Gamer No. 39. Barton commented that "I highly recommend The Vanguard Reaches to all Travellers looking for new and varied ports of call. Paranoia Press has produced another very professional item in this supplement and has demonstrated itself as a company to keep an eye on in the future for further Traveller-related releases."

Reviews
 Dragon #58 (Feb., 1982)

References

Role-playing game supplements introduced in 1981
Traveller (role-playing game) supplements